The Prentice Ministry was the combined Cabinet (called Executive Council of Alberta), chaired by 16th Premier of Alberta Jim Prentice, that governed Alberta from September 15, 2014 to May 24, 2015. It was made up of members of the Progressive Conservative Party (PC).

Cabinet composition and shuffles

Prentice's cabinet was sworn in on September 15, 2014. At 16 ministers and three associate ministers, it was significantly smaller than the Redford Ministry, which numbered 19 ministers and 10 assosciate ministers. Prentice took two portfolios himself: international and intergovernmental relations and aboriginal relations. Prentice dropped several high-profile ministers from cabinet, such as Doug Horner and Fred Horne, and brought in six new members: Gordon Dirks, David Dorward, Stephen Khan, Maureen Kubinec, Stephen Mandel and Ric McIver. Dirks, a former Calgary school board chair, and Mandel, former mayor of Edmonton, were not MLAs at the time of their appointment, becoming the first unelected cabinet ministers in Alberta since the 1930s. Prentice defended their appointments, saying "bringing in new government means bringing in new blood", and stressed that they would run in by-elections before the legislature resumed. Of the ten cabinet ministers who were held over from the Hancock and Redford ministries, six were moved to new portfolios and four — Naresh Bhardwaj, Jonathan Denis, Wayne Drysdale and Verlyn Olson — stayed put.

On April 25, 2015, in the middle of the 2015 Alberta general election, Jonathan Denis resigned as justice minister due to "legal proceedings" against him by his estranged wife. Prentice asked for Denis' resignation due to the involvement of the courts. Agriculture minister Verlyn Olson took over the justice portfolio in an acting capacity.

List of ministers

See also 
 Executive Council of Alberta
 List of Alberta provincial ministers

References

Politics of Alberta
Executive Council of Alberta
2014 establishments in Alberta
Cabinets established in 2014
2015 disestablishments in Alberta
Cabinets disestablished in 2015